Rhinanthus is a genus of annual hemiparasitic herbaceous plants in the family Orobanchaceae, formerly classified in the family Scrophulariaceae. Its species are commonly known as rattles. The genus consists of about 30 to 40 species found in Europe, northern Asia, and North America, with the greatest species diversity (28 species) in Europe.

Phylogeny 
The phylogeny of the genera of Rhinantheae has been explored using molecular characters. Rhinanthus is the sister genus to Lathraea, and then to Rhynchocorys. These three genera share phylogenetic affinities with members of the core Rhinantheae: Bartsia, Euphrasia, Tozzia, Hedbergia, Bellardia, and Odontites. Melampyrum appears as a more distant relative.

Systematics

Selected species

References

External links 
Flora Europaea: Rhinanthus
Flora of China: Rhinanthus
Germplasm Resources Information Network: Rhinanthus

Orobanchaceae genera
 
Parasitic plants